Zereia, also known as Zeira, was a town of Chalcidice, in ancient Macedonia. 

It probably belonged to the Delian League since it appears in the tribute registry of Athens for the year 422/1 BCE, where it had to pay a phoros of 500 drachmas although it does not appear in any other tribute registry. 

It has been suggested that it is related to a passage from Stephanus of Byzantium that collects a fragment of Theopompus that mentions the Zeranians (Ζηράνιοι) located in Thrace and another fragment of Ephorus that indicates the name of the region of Zerania (Ζηρανία).

Its site is unlocated.

References

Populated places in ancient Macedonia
Former populated places in Greece
Geography of ancient Chalcidice
Members of the Delian League
Lost ancient cities and towns